César Neira Pérez (born 15 December 1979) is a cyclist from Spain.

Personal 
Neira was born on 15 December 1979 in Cadalso de los Vidrios, Madrid. He has cerebral palsy.

Cycling 
Neira is a C4 classified cyclist. He started as a road cyclist. He competed at the 2008 Summer Paralympics in cycling.  He was the number one cyclists to finish in the Road Trial race. He won a bronze  in the Individual Pursuit track race. He also competed in cycling at the 2012 Summer Paralympics and 2016 Summer Paralympics.

References

External links 
  (2008, 2012)
  (2016)
 

1979 births
Living people
Spanish male cyclists
Paralympic cyclists of Spain
Paralympic gold medalists for Spain
Paralympic bronze medalists for Spain
Paralympic medalists in cycling
Cyclists at the 2008 Summer Paralympics
Cyclists at the 2012 Summer Paralympics
Cyclists at the 2016 Summer Paralympics
Medalists at the 2008 Summer Paralympics
Cyclists from the Community of Madrid